Cowles Bog is a 4,000-year-old wetland complex in Indiana Dunes National Park, near Chesterton, Indiana.  It is named for Henry Chandler Cowles who did his pioneering work in ecology and ecological succession here.  His work brought international attention to the area which led to efforts to preserve the Indiana Dunes.  It was designated a National Natural Landmark in 1965. It contains bog, fen, marsh, wet meadow, swamp, and pond habitats.

Preservation

Cowles had been writing papers on plant succession for several years based on research he did in the area before he was part of the 1913 International Phytogeographical Excursion which brought other international scientists to the site.  Dorothy Buell founded the Save the Dunes Council which led to the purchase of the wetland complex.

Location
The wetland is located west of Mineral Springs Road.  The general area is accessible by the Cowles Bog Trail of  Indiana Dunes National Park. Parking is available at the trailhead, just before the guardhouse to Dune Acres.   The trail does not lead into the bog, which is nearly inaccessible due to the nature of the plant life surrounding it.  Dr. Cowles work included the bog and the marshlands to the south of the trail and the dune slopes to the north of the trail. Cowles Bog is drained by the West Branch Tributary of Dunes Creek to Lake Michigan.

Soils
Cowles Bog is considered a wetland complex, rather than a 'true' bog such as Pinhook Bog, also a part of the Indiana Dunes National Park.  The main body of the bog is composed of muck created from marsh plants and the woody plants that have encroached into the area.  Surrounding the bog proper is an area covered with a thin layer of leaf litter over a thin layer of topsoil.  The area is moderately acidic.  Wet depressions exist which reveal a substratum of Maumee soils, a loamy fine sand.  These loamy sands extend southward through the marsh area.  To the north the dunes consist of Plainfield fine sand, which is heavily oxidized.

Vegetation
The bog is a wetland woods.  In the 1960s, there was still a noticeable open bog.  This has effectively closed.  The woods is dominated by red maple and yellow birch.  There are tamarack, paper birch, and white pine, which together only reach numbers equal to the red maple and yellow birch separately.  Immature trees exist in all the lower layers of the woods with the red maple and yellow birch still dominating.

The shrub layer is along the bog's edge and fills the center area of the bog.  Dominant here are spicebush and poison sumac.  The predominance of poison sumac makes access to the bog very difficult.  Additionally, there are quantities of witch hazel, red osier, grape and blackberry.

At ground level, the herb layer includes columbine, boneset, jewel weed, nettle, twinberry, mayapple, hispid greenbrier, meadow rue, narrow-leaved cattail and grape.

Orchids are becoming increasingly more common as restoration work has been going on putting orchids back in their natural habitat. Purple pitcher plant (Sarracenia purpurea), while once common, has been poached from the area and no longer occurs.

Wildlife
The wetland complex primarily supports insect and bird life.  Beavers have been known to inhabit the surrounding wetlands in 1988. White Tail Deer are present also.

Restoration
Since the early 1900s, when Cowles studied the 'bog', the land has been changing. The once diverse sedge meadow had been replaced by a monoculture of hybrid cattails.  The National Park Service has identified that the changes which have caused this include: changes in seasonal water levels, water chemistry, changes in plant density, and changes in the soil and the seed banks.  These changes have been the result of changes in the surrounding area, including the construction or roads and of drainage ditches.  In 2009, the national lakeshore received a 3-year grant to begin the restoration of the wetlands.

Cowles Bog Trail
The trail takes you along the northern edge of 'Cowles Bog'.  The trail consist of three loops beginning at the Cowles Bog Trailhead parking area.  Lake Michigan can be reached on this trail in only  by using the most direct route.
It requires that you use the southern loop  to get to and from it.
This is the highest of the dunes and the steepest portion of the trail.

Cowles research
 Cowles, H.C. 1899.  Ecological relation of the vegetation on sand dunes of Lake Michigan. Bot. Gaz 27: 95-117; 167-202; 281-308; 361-388
 Cowles, H.C. 1901. The physiographic ecology of Chicago and vicinity. Bot. Gaz. 31: 73-108; 145-182
 Cowles, H.C. 1901. The plant societies of Chicago and vicinity.  Bull. Geog. Soc. Of Chicago, No 2: 1-76

See also
Pinhook Bog
Indiana Dunes State Park

References

Sources
 Bennett, L.F. 1917.  The sand dune region as a national park.  Proc. Indiana Acad. Sci. 26: 261-263
 Buhl, C. A. 1935. Notes on the flora of the Indiana Dunes. Am Midland Nat. 16: 248-253
 Cressey, G.R. 1928.  The Indiana sand dunes and shore lines of the Lake Michigan basin.  Univ. Chicago Press.  Geog. Soc. Of Chicago, Bull. 8
 Eifrig, C.W. 1919.  The birds of the sand dunes of northwestern Indiana.  Proc Indiana Acad. Sci. 28: 280-303
 Lyon, M.W. Jr, 1923.  Notes on the mammals of the dune region of Porter County, Indiana. Proc. Indiana Acad. Sci. 32: 209-221
 -------------------- 1924. Some soil and water reactions in the dunes region of Porter County.  Proc Indiana Acad. Sci. 33: 281-284
 Olson, J.S. 1951.  Vegetation –substrate relations in the Lake Michigan sand dunes.  Ph.D. Dissertation, Univ. Chicago.
 ------------. 1958. Rates of succession and soil changes on southern Lake Michigan sand dunes.  Bot. Gaz. 119: 125-170
 Peattie, D.C. 1930.  Flora of the Indiana Dunes.  Field Museum of Nat. History Chicago, 432p.
 Potzger, J.E. 1938.  Some acidity studies in dunes and bogs.  Proc. Indiana Acad. Sci 47: 100-105
 Rand, A. L. and A.S. Rand. 1946. Mammal bones from dunes south of Lake Michigan. Am. Midland Nat. 46: 649-659.
 Tryon, R.M. Jr. 1936.  Ferns of the dune region of Indiana. Amer. Midland Nat. 17: 425-249.

External links
National Natural Landmark: Cowles Bog
Indiana Dunes National Park: Cowles Bog

Bogs of Indiana
Indiana Dunes National Park
National Natural Landmarks in Indiana
Protected areas of Porter County, Indiana
Protected areas established in 1966
Landforms of Porter County, Indiana